Asakayama may refer to:

Asakayama stable, a stable of sumo wrestlers
Asakayama Oyakata, the head coach of Asakayama stable, ex-ōzeki Kaiō Hiroyuki
Asakayama Station, a railway station in Sakai-ku, Sakai, Japan